So Ended a Great Love (German: So endete eine Liebe) is a 1934 German historical romance film directed by Karl Hartl and starring Paula Wessely, Willi Forst and Gustaf Gründgens.

The film's sets were designed by the art director Werner Schlichting. The film was made at the Johannisthal Studios in Berlin, with location shooting taking place in Würzburg and Hungary. An English-language version of the film was planned but never produced.

Cast 
 Paula Wessely as Grand Duchess Marie Louise
 Willi Forst as Franz, Duke of Modena
 Gustaf Gründgens as Count Metternich
 Franz Herterich as Emperor Franz I
 Erna Morena as Josephine
 Maria Koppenhöfer as Madame Mère
 Edwin Jürgensen as Talleyrand
 Rose Stradner as Kaiserin Maria Ludovica
 Gustav Waldau as Hofrat
 Helmuth Rudolph as Erster Offizier
 Olga Engl as erste Gesellschaftsdame der Kaiserin Maria Ludovika
 Annemarie Steinsieck as zweite Gesellschaftsdame der Kaiserin Maria Ludovika
 Toni Tetzlaff as dritte Gesellschaftsdame der Kaiserin Maria Ludovika
 Erich Dunskus as Laurenz, Maler Metternichs
 Angelo Ferrari as Ballettmeister

References

Bibliography
 Hans-Michael Bock and Tim Bergfelder. The Concise Cinegraph: An Encyclopedia of German Cinema. Berghahn Books, 2009.

External links 

1930s historical romance films
German historical romance films
1930s German-language films
1934 films
Films set in the 1800s
Cultural depictions of Klemens von Metternich
Cultural depictions of Charles Maurice de Talleyrand-Périgord
Cultural depictions of Joséphine de Beauharnais
Films shot at Johannisthal Studios
Cine-Allianz films
German black-and-white films
1930s German films